Justice Warner may refer to:

John Warner (judge) (born 1943), associate justice of the Montana Supreme Court
Harold J. Warner (1890–1982), associate justice and chief justice of the Oregon Supreme Court
Hiram B. Warner (1802–1881), associate justice of the Supreme Court of Georgia